Rupa Sree is an Indian film and television actress who appeared in Tamil 
and Malayalam films and television soap operas. She made her acting debut with the Malayalam film Kallanum Polisum (1992) with Mukesh in the lead. The Malayalam serial Chandanamazha, aired on Asianet, rose her into fame, and she was well accepted by Malayali audience as "Urmila Devi" (her character in Chandanamazha). She is one of the most sought out actresses in Tamil and Malayalam television serials.

Biography
Sree hails from Chennai, Tamil Nadu. She has four sisters. She started her acting career, at the age of 13 years, as a heroine. later she moved to character roles and supporting roles. She appeared in glamorous roles as well. She took a break from movies after marriage. Her husband is also in film field. Again she made a comeback through serials, and now she is appearing in Tamil and Malayalam serials. As of November 2015, she is participating in a popular reality show on Flowers TV titled Kuttikalavara.

Filmography

Television 
Serials

Other shows

Awards

References

External links

Roopa Sree Interview in Ananda Vikatan

Social Media Profiles
 https://instagram.com/rupasree01

1976 births
Actresses in Tamil cinema
Indian film actresses
Actresses in Malayalam cinema
Living people
Place of birth missing (living people)
Actresses from Chennai
Indian television actresses
Actresses in Malayalam television
Actresses in Telugu television
20th-century Indian actresses
21st-century Indian actresses
Actresses in Kannada cinema